Audio-Files is a television music series produced by BYUtv.  The series combines interviews, concerts, and behind-the-scenes footage of nationally rising indie bands.  The show premiered on April 10, 2012, at 6:30 pm MST, 8:30 pm EST.

On March 3, 2012, the first promo commercial was released. On March 29, 2012, BYUtv housed a pre-screening inside BYU's new broadcasting building.  The show's first press release was on February 29, 2012.  Past episodes can be viewed on the show's website.

The first season featured rising bands including Neon Trees (Mercury), Imagine Dragons (Interscope), Mason Jennings (Brushfire), Trampled By Turtles (Banjodad), Low (Sub Pop), Damien Jurado (Secretly Canadian), Joshua James (Northplatte), and Paper Route (Universal Motown).

The second season featured bands including The Head and the Heart (Sub Pop), The Album Leaf (Sub Pop), Mates of State (Barsuk), Nada Surf (Barsuk), Akron/Family (Dead Oceans), and more.

Salt Lake City Weekly named the series "Best Music Television 2013".

List of artists have performed on Audio-Files

References

External links
 
 

Rock music television series
2012 American television series debuts
BYU TV original programming